Edward Weidner (1921–2007) was an American educator, public administration scholar and founder of the University of Wisconsin–Green Bay Weidner Center.

External links
 University of Wisconsin profile of Weidner
 Office of Chancellor University of Wisconsin

20th-century American educators
1921 births
University of Minnesota College of Liberal Arts alumni
2007 deaths
Roosevelt High School (Minnesota) alumni